The FIFA 100 is a list of Brazilian footballer Pelé's choice of the "greatest living footballers". Unveiled on 4 March 2004 at a gala ceremony in London, England, the FIFA 100 marked part of the celebrations of the 100th anniversary of the foundation of the Fédération Internationale de Football Association (FIFA), the international governing body of football.

The figure 100 refers to the 100th anniversary of FIFA and not the number of players listed, which is actually 125; Pelé had been asked to select 50 active players and 50 retired players, for a total of 100 players, but found it too difficult to limit the number of former players to just 50. The list contains 123 men and two women (Michelle Akers and Mia Hamm). At the time the FIFA 100 was selected, 50 of the players were still active, with the remaining 75 retired from the game.

Criticism
Some football observers have questioned the selection methodology of the list. David Mellor, politician turned football pundit, wrote in his column in the Evening Standard that he felt the selections were politically motivated rather than made on purely footballing grounds. He suggested that the selections looked as if they came from the pen of Sepp Blatter rather than Pelé. As evidence for this, Mellor noted the wide geographical spread of the selected players: a true selection would be more heavily biased to South America and Europe, he argued. Such assertions were also forwarded by BBC columnist Tim Vickery.

One of Pelé's old teammates, the former Brazil midfielder Gérson, reacted to his omission from the FIFA 100 by tearing up a copy of the list on a Brazilian television programme. Marco van Basten and Uwe Seeler refused to take part in the project on a point of principle.

List
Following is the list of the "FIFA 100" greatest living footballers as nominated by Pelé in March 2004.

Players active at the time of announcement are marked by (*). , Gianluigi Buffon is the only still active player on the list.

See also
World Soccer's Greatest Players of the 20th Century
World Team of the 20th Century

References

External links
The FIFA 100

 
Lists of association football players
100
Pelé
Association football player non-biographical articles